Madison Township is a township in Polk County, Iowa, United States.  Currently Diane Conway serves as clerk with a term expiring in 2018. Trustees Include: Raymond Conway (Term Expiring 2018), Jon Johnson (Term Expiring 2016), and Doug Currie (Term Expiring 2016)

History
Madison Township was organized in 1847.

References

Townships in Polk County, Iowa
Townships in Iowa
1847 establishments in Iowa